Dumbek rhythms are a collection of rhythms that are usually played with hand drums such as the dumbek. These rhythms are various combinations of these three basic sounds:

Doom (D), produced with the dominant hand striking the sweet spot of the skin.
Tak (T), produced with the recessive hand striking the rim.
Ka (K), produced with the dominant hand striking the rim.

Notation

In a simple notation, these three sounds are represented by three letters: D, T, and K. When capitalized, the beat is emphasized, and when lower-case, it is played less emphatically. These basic sounds can be combined with other sounds:

Sak or slap (S) (sometimes called 'pa'), produced with the dominant hand. Similar to the doom except the fingers are cupped to capture the air, making a loud terminating sound. The hand remains on the drum head to prevent sustain.
Trill (l), produced by lightly tapping three fingers of one hand in rapid succession on the rim
Roll or (rash, r), produced by a rapid alternating pattern of taks and kas

This is the simple dumbek rhythm notation for the 2/4 rhythm known as ayyoub:
1-&-2-&-
D--kD-T-

Rhythms
There are many traditional rhythms. Some are much more popular than others. The "big six" Middle Eastern rhythms are Ayyoub, Beledi (Masmoudi Saghir), Chiftitelli, Maqsoum, Masmoudi and Saidi.

References

See also
Iqa'
Wazn
Egyptian music
Belly dance
Arabic music
Usul (music)

Rhythm and meter 
Percussion performance techniques